Mariana de Carvajal y Saavedra (1620–1670) was a Spanish writer of the Spanish Golden Age.

Biography 
Mariana de Carvajal y Piédrola was born in Jaén. She spent her youth in Granada, where she married Baltasar Mateo de Velázquez, a military man, and mayor of Hijosdalgo of the Royal Chancery of Granada. Subsequently, the couple moved to Madrid. In 1663, there is evidence that she wrote 12 comedies, which have disappeared. Some of her novels are set in the city of Úbeda. The genre of her work is referred to as the courtly novel.

Selected works 
 La industria vence desdenes
 La dicha de Dositea 
 Navidades de Madrid y noches entretenidas (Madrid, 1663). (It is a work that includes eight novels.)

References

External links 
 Digital edition of Navidades de Madrid, at the Biblioteca Virtual de Andalucía
 Works of Mariana de Carvajal y Saavedra at the Biblioteca Virtual Miguel de Cervantes
Navidades de Madrid y noches entretenidas: edición digital de seis novelas. A digital annotated edition of six novels from Mariana de Carvajal y Saavedra’s collection Navidades de Madrid y noches entretenidas (1663), prepared by students in SPAN 365: Female Authors and Empowerment in Spain’s Golden Age (Gettysburg College, Spring 2021)

1620 births
1670 deaths
17th-century Spanish writers
Spanish women writers
People from Jaén, Spain
Spanish women novelists